The 55th Annual Miss Universe Puerto Rico pageant was held on November 12, 2009 in San Juan, Puerto Rico.

Mayra Matos, who won the title of Miss Puerto Rico Universe 2009, crowned her successor Mariana Vicente as Miss Universe Puerto Rico 2010, who then represented Puerto Rico at the Miss Universe 2010 pageant.

The preliminary took place on October 29, 2009, where 10 contestants were chosen by a groups of judges as semi-finalists. Another group of 10 contestants where chosen via text message. Víctor Manuelle and Jencarlos Canela were the special guests.

Results

Placements

Special awards

Castings
Eight casting calls were held throughout Puerto Rico beginning on May 9, 2009 and ending on June 28, 2009. Over 60 women were selected as pre-contestants, but only 40 became the official contestants in an event on July 11, 2009 in Teatro Ambassador in San Juan. During the event five contestants were given the Special Awards of the night:

 Best Presentation/Projection: Ariana Rodriguez - Miss Carolina
 Best Catwalk: Aideliz Hidalgo - Miss Cayey
 Best Look Change: Juanita Acosta - Miss Toa Alta
 Best Mood in Competition: Kathleen Flores - Miss Utuado
 Best Self-Presentation: Coral Del Mar Casanova - Miss Hatillo

Buscando La Mas Bella
Buscando La Mas Bella is an interactive reality show featuring the 40 contestants in different activities and challenges. Each week people will have the chance to vote through a text message for their favorite contestant of the week, that contestant will have the chance to automatically advance to the finals and land a spot in the Top 20. There will be 10 contestant chosen like that, the other 10 will be chosen in the Preliminatory competition by a panel of experts. The show airs Sundays on Telemundo, since August 30 and finished on October 29, two weeks before the final night of Miss Universe Puerto Rico 2010. The show is hosted by Miss Puerto Rico national director and ex-Miss Puerto Rico 1995, Desiree Lowry. A panel of judges composed of Miss Universe 2006, Zuleyka Rivera, Miss Puerto Rico 2000, Zoribel Fonalledas, fashion designer Luis Antonio and actor Albert Rodriguez evaluate the girls each week in their challenges.

Buscando La Mas Bella winners:
 1st Week Winner: Acting Challenge: Yenitzia Ocasio - Miss Juana Diaz
 2nd Week Winner: Physical Condition Challenge: Rocio Jorge - Miss Las Marias
 3rd Week Winner: Outfit Presentation Challenge: Imarie Cintrón - Miss Santa Isabel
 4th Week Winner: Commercial "Pico y Espuela" Challenge: Candy Figueroa - Miss Toa Baja
 5th Week Winner: Celebrity Interview Challenge: Kathryn Burgos - Miss Yabucoa
 6th Week Winner: Protocol Challenge: Kathleen Flores - Miss Utuado
 7th Week Winner: Halloween Photoshoot Challenge: Desmarie Nieves - Miss Bayamón
 8th Week Winner: Dance Routine Challenge: Katherine Ortiz - Miss Orocovis
 Preliminary Competition People's Choice: Chrisangelly Franco - Miss Dorado
 Primera Hora Newspaper People's Choice: Liannelys Rodriguez - Miss Humacao

Contestants
Here is a list of the official 39 contestants:

Notes
 Miss Río Grande is a well known model in the island and won "La Cara de Imagen L'Oréal 2005".
 Miss Barceloneta is a well known supermodel in the island and represented Puerto Rico in Miss Global Beauty Queen 2008.
 Miss Mayagüez is a well known supermodel in the island. She previously competed in Miss Puerto Rico 2006 where she finished as Top 13 and in Miss Puerto Rico Teen 2005.
 Miss Cayey competed in Nuestra Belleza Latina 2008 and finished as 9th place.
 Miss Canóvanas competed for Nuestra Belleza Latina 2010 and finished as 2nd runner-up.
 Miss San Juan was semi-finalist for Nuestra Belleza Latina 2010.
 Miss Dorado competed in Miss Puerto Rico Teen 2006 where she finished as 1st runner-up.
 Miss Rincón won the Miss Puerto Rico Teenage 2006.
 Miss San Lorenzo competed in Miss Puerto Rico 2009 but didn't qualify as a finalist.
 Miss Carolina competed in the Elite Model Look 2004 where she qualified as Top 15.
 Miss Salinas competed in Miss Puerto Rico 2004 but she didn't qualify as a finalist.
 Miss Caguas competed in Nuestra Belleza Latina 2011 and finished as 6th place.

Disqualifications
 Miss Salinas, Karen Marie Lopez, left the competition on November 10, apparently for undisclosed personal reasons.

Crossovers
 Yeidy Bosques (Miss Mayagüez) was crowned Miss Earth Puerto Rico 2010 and was crowned Miss Earth Fire 2010 as 3rd runner-up.
 Aideliz Hidalgo (Miss Cayey) was crowned Miss Puerto Rico international 2010 and finished as Top 15 semi-finalist at Miss International 2010.

Franchise Change
 In 2009 Magali Febles lost the franchise to send Puerto Rico's representative to the Miss Universe pageant. Miss Puerto Rico 1995, Desiree Lowry was appointed as the new owner of the franchise, making the Miss Puerto Rico 2010 pageant the first pageant under the direction of Desiree who took over the preparation of Mayra Matos for competing in Miss Universe 2009.

References

External links

 https://web.archive.org/web/20110202014622/http://missuniversepuertorico.com/mu/
 https://web.archive.org/web/20121104001631/http://www.primerahora.com/XStatic/primerahora/template/content.aspx?se=especiales&ms=missuniversepr2010
 Telemundo transmitirá Miss Universe Puerto Rico

2009 in Puerto Rico
Puerto Rico 2009
2010 beauty pageants